The Pratt & Whitney R-4360 Wasp Major is an American 28-cylinder four-row radial piston aircraft engine designed and built during World War II. It was the last of the Pratt & Whitney Wasp family, and the culmination of its maker's piston engine technology.

The war was over before it could power airplanes into combat. It powered many of the last generation of large piston-engined aircraft before turbojets, but was supplanted by equivalent (and superior) powered turboprops (such as the Allison T56).

Its main rival was the twin-row, 18-cylinder, nearly  displacement, up to  Wright R-3350 Duplex-Cyclone, first run some seven years earlier (May 1937).

Design and development
The R-4360 was a 28-cylinder four-row air-cooled radial engine. Each row of seven air-cooled cylinders possessed a slight angular offset from the previous, forming a semi-helical arrangement to facilitate effective airflow cooling of the cylinder rows behind them, inspiring the engine's "corncob" nickname. A mechanical supercharger geared at 6.374:1 ratio to engine speed provided forced induction, while the propeller was geared at 0.375:1 so that the tips did not reach inefficient supersonic speeds.

The engine was a technological challenge and the first product from Pratt and Whitney's new plant near Kansas City, Missouri. The four-row configuration had severe thermal problems that decreased reliability, with an intensive maintenance regime involving frequent replacement of cylinders required.  Large cooling flaps were required, which decreased aerodynamic efficiency, putting extra demands on engine power when cooling needs were greatest.  Owing in large part to the maintenance requirements of the R-4360, all airplanes equipped with it were costly to operate and suffered decreased availability. Its commercial application in the Boeing Stratocruiser was unprofitable without government subsidy.  Abandonment of the Stratocruiser was almost immediate when jet aircraft became available, while aircraft with smaller powerplants such as the Lockheed Constellation and Douglas DC-6 remained in service well into the jet era.

Initial models developed , and later models . One model that used two large turbochargers in addition to the supercharger delivered .

Wasp Majors were produced between 1944 and 1955; 18,697 were built.

A derivative engine, the Pratt & Whitney R-2180-E Twin Wasp E, was essentially the R-4360 "cut in half". It had two rows of seven cylinders each, and was used on the postwar Saab 90 Scandia airliner.

Variants

 R-4360-4 - 
 R-4360-17 -  XB-35 and YB-35 outboard engines with 8-bladed contra-rotating propellers
 R-4360-20 - 
 R-4360-21 -  XB-35 and YB-35 inboard engines with 8-bladed contra-rotating propellers
 R-4360-25 - 
 R-4360-41 - 
 R-4360-45 -  YB-35 outboard engines with 4-bladed propellers
 R-4360-47 -  YB-35 inboard engines with 4-bladed propellers
 R-4360-51 VDT - "Variable Discharge Turbine" 4,300 hp (3,210 kW). Intended for B-36C. Used on Boeing YB-50C Superfortress. 2-Power recovery turbines.
 R-4360-53 - 
 R-4360-B3 - 
 R-4360-B6 -

Applications

Engines on display 

 An R-4360 is on display at the Texas Air Museum - Stinson Chapter, San Antonio, Texas
 An R-4360 is on display at the Mid America Museum of Aviation and Transportation in Sioux City, Iowa.
 An R-4360 is on display at the Museum of Flight in Seattle, Washington.
 An R-4360 is on display at the Heritage Flight Museum in Burlington, Washington.
 An R-4360 is on display at the New England Air Museum, in Windsor Locks, Connecticut.
 An R-4360 is on display at the Museum of Alaska Transportation and Industry in Wasilla, Alaska.
 An R-4360 is on display at the Pioneer Air Museum in Fairbanks, Alaska.
 An R-4360 is on display at the CAF Airpower Museum in Dallas, Texas.
 An R-4360 is on display at the Air Zoo in Kalamazoo, Michigan.
 An R-4360-4W is on display at the Yankee Air Museum in Belleville, Michigan
 An R-4360-20WA is on display at the Teaneck Ignition Service in Teaneck, New Jersey.
 An R-4360-20WD is on display at the Combat Air Museum in Topeka, Kansas.
 An R-4360-59B is on display at the Combat Air Museum in Topeka, Kansas.
 An R-4360-69 is on display at the Castle Air Museum in Atwater, California.
 An R-4360 cutaway is on display at the Hill Aerospace Museum at Hill Air Force Base in Roy, Utah.
 An R-4360 cutaway is on display at the Air Victory Museum in Lumberton, New Jersey.
 An R-4360 cutaway is on display at the Air Zoo in Kalamazoo, Michigan.
 An R-4360 cutaway is on display at the Museum of Aviation in Warner Robins, Georgia.
 An R-4360 cutaway is on display at the Evergreen Aviation and Space Museum in McMinnville, Oregon.
 An R-4360 cutaway is on display at the CAF Airpower Museum in Dallas, Texas.
 An R-4360 cutaway is on display at the Pima Air and Space Museum in Tucson, Arizona.
 An R-4360 cutaway is on display at the Air Force Armament Museum at Eglin Air Force Base in Valparaiso, Florida.
 An R-4360 cutaway is on display at the Strategic Air Command & Aerospace Museum in Ashland, Nebraska.
 An R-4360-4 cutaway is on display at the National Museum of Naval Aviation in Pensacola, Florida.
 An R-4360-59B cutaway is on display at the Steven F. Udvar-Hazy Center of the National Air and Space Museum in Chantilly, Virginia.
 An R-4360-59B cutaway is on display at the Florida Air Museum in Lakeland, Florida.
 An R-4360 cutaway is on display at the Mid-Atlantic Air Museum, Reading, Pennsylvania
 Wreckage of an R-4360 is on display as a memorial in the Ben Shemen Forest in Israel.
 An R-4360 is on display at the presidential gallery at the National Museum of the United States Air Force in Dayton, Ohio.
 An operational R-4360 is on display at the Penngrove Power and Implement Museum in Penngrove, California.
 Two R-4360s are on public display at the Aerospace Museum of California. One is complete, the other is a cutaway.
 An operational R-4360 is on display at Nieman's Harley Rentals in St Helena, California

Specifications (R-4360-51VDT)

See also

References

Notes

Bibliography

External links

 Pratt & Whitney R-4360 page
 Pratt Whitney
 National Museum of the USAFR-4360 fact sheet
"3,500 h.p. Radial" a 1947 Flight article on the Wasp Major

1940s aircraft piston engines
Aircraft air-cooled radial piston engines
R-4360